Fantasy Masters' Codex is a 1981 fantasy role-playing game supplement for The Fantasy Trip published by Metagaming Concepts.

Contents
Fantasy Masters' Codex contains an index to all The Fantasy Trip materials published through 1980, lists of the talents, spells, magic items, potions and equipment - each sorted several ways - a DX adjustment table, a table of saving throws and listings of jobs, races and monsters.

Reception
William A. Barton reviewed Fantasy Masters' Codex in The Space Gamer No. 41. Barton commented that "While the index to TFT is quite useful (and should have been released separately at a lower price), what Metagaming seems to have done with The Fantasy Masters' Codex 1981 is too little for too much."

References

Fantasy role-playing game supplements
Role-playing game supplements introduced in 1981